Kirana Larasati (born 29 August 1987) is an Indonesian actress born and raised in Jakarta, Indonesia. She made her acting debut in a television drama series Tunjuk Satu Bintang (2002). She won a best actress award in Festival Film Bandung for her role in the hit television series Azizah (2007). She is also a vocal advocate of anti-drug campaign which she supports through various charitable organisations.

Career
Larasti began her acting career with minor roles in the television films after she was scouted by a casting director from PT Soraya Intercine Film. These parts led to her being cast as a series regular on the Indosiar drama series Itukan CInta (2004) alongside actors Sahrul Gunawan, Bertrand Antolin, and Fera Feriska. She rose to prominence as the lead role in Azizah, one of the most popular television show in the year 2007. She started acting in feature films in 2006 including Perempuan Punya Cerita (2007), Slank Gak Ada Matinya (Slank Never Dies) in 2013, and Turis Romantis (2015).

Endorsements
 Vitacimin (2002) Takeda Japan
 Lovy Mint (2003)
 Biore (2003) Kao Japan
 Fres & Natural Soap (2003–2004)
 Fres & Natural Cologne (2004)
 Rexona (2005) Unilever
 Fuji Film (2006)
 Gery Cokluut (2006)
 Garuda Ting-Ting (2006)
 Flexi (2008) Telkom Indonesia

Personal life
Kirana Larasati became engaged to the general manager of Oz Radio Tama Gandjar on May 9, 2015. Larasati and Gandjar were officially married on August 23, 2015 at Bandung, West Java. They have a son, Kyo Karura Gantama (born 2016).

Filmography

Film
 2006      Gotcha as Kayla
 2006	D'Girlz Begins as Casandra
 2007	Perempuan Punya Cerita as Safina
 2008	Claudia/Jasmine as Claudia
 2011	Purple Love as Shelly
 2012	Sanubari Jakarta as the film director
 2013	Slank Nggak Ada Matinya as April
 2014	Kota Tua Jakarta as Dara
 2015	Turis Romantis	 as Nabil
 2015	Nenek Siam

Television
 Tunjuk Satu Bintang (2002)
 Senandung Masa Puber (2003–2004)
 Bidadari 3 (2003–2005)
 Kawin Gantung (2003–2005)
 Hati di Pucuk Sekali 1 (2003–2004)
 Itukan Cinta (2004)
 Tangisan Anak Tiri (2004–2005)
 Kehormatan 2 (2004)
 Hati di Pucuk Sekali 2 (2004)
Jangan Berhenti Mencintaiku (2004–2006)
 Kala Cinta Menggoda (2005)
 Sweet 17 (2005)
 Titipan Ilahi (2005)
 Kurindu Jiwaku (2005)
 Habibi dan Habibah (2005–2006)
 Aku Bukan Untukmu (2006)
 Benci Bilang Cinta (2006)
 Kakak Iparku 17 Tahun (2007)
 Pasangan Heboh (2007)
 Azizah (2007) as Azizah
 Karissa (2008) as Karissa
 Cucu Menantu (2008–2009) as Vina
 Cinta Bunga 2 (2009) as Kasih/Bunga
 Cinta Indah 2 (2009) as Indah
 Tangisan Issabela (2009) as Isabella
 Cinta Nia (2009)
 Kesetiaan Cinta (2009) as Agnes
 3 Sahabat (2010)
 The Real Action Series of ELANG (2014) as Karin

References

External links 

1987 births
Living people
Actresses from Jakarta
Indonesian film actresses